Arthur Martin Short (born 27 September 1947) is a former South African cricketer. He never played Test cricket for South Africa but was selected on the 1970 squad to tour England and the 1971–72 squad to tour Australia. Both trips were cancelled.

An opening batsman, Short played first-class cricket in South Africa from 1966 to 1975. He top-scored for Natal in their match against the touring Australians in February 1970, scoring 78 and impressing the national selectors.

References

External links
Arthur Short at Cricinfo

Living people
1947 births
South African cricketers
Eastern Province cricketers
KwaZulu-Natal cricketers
South African Universities cricketers
People from Graaff-Reinet
Cricketers from the Eastern Cape